An orchard is an intentional planting of trees or shrubs maintained for food production.

Orchard(s) may also refer to:

Seed orchard, refers usually to a place where seeds for forest culture are produced
Orchard (surname)
Orchard FM, an independent radio station in England
Orchard Books, a children's book publisher
Orchard oriole (Icterus spurius), a small blackbird
Orchard (RTD), a transit station in Greenwood Village, Colorado
Orchard (VTA), a transit station in San Jose, California
Operation Orchard, Israeli airstrike in Syria

Places

Australia 
Orchard Hills, New South Wales

Singapore 
Orchard Road, a road in Singapore where the retail and entertainment hub of the city-state is located
Orchard Towers, a Shopping Centre in Orchard Road, Singapore

South Africa 
Orchards, Gauteng
 Orchards, Johannesburg

United Kingdom 
East Orchard, a village in England
West Orchard, a village in England
Orchard Portman, a parish/village in England
Orchard Wyndham, a historic house and estate in Somerset, England
Orchards, Surrey, a country house in England

United States 
Orchard, Colorado, in Morgan County
Orchard City, Colorado, in Delta County
Orchard Mesa, Colorado, in Mesa County
Orchard Hill, Georgia
Orchard, Iowa
Orchard Lake Village, Michigan
Orchard Farm, Missouri
Orchard Homes, Montana
Orchard, Nebraska
Orchard, Texas
Orchard Grove, Wisconsin
Orchards, Washington
Piney Orchard, Maryland
Port Orchard, Washington

Technology
Orchard Project, an open source content management system written in ASP.NET

See also
Orchard (company), an online smartphone reseller
Orchard Court, London hotel
Orchard Square, a shopping centre in Sheffield, England
Plum Orchard, a historic facility listed in the U.S. National Register of Historic Places
Port Orchard, a strait of the Puget Sound in the state of Washington
library@orchard, a Singaporean library on Orchard Road
The Orchard (disambiguation)
Cherry Orchard (disambiguation)
Crab Orchard (disambiguation)
Orchard Beach (disambiguation)
Orchard Lake (disambiguation)
Orchard Park (disambiguation)
Orchard Hill (disambiguation)
Orchard Hills (disambiguation)